Prison is a 1987 horror film directed by Renny Harlin and starring Viggo Mortensen, Tom Everett, Kane Hodder, Lane Smith, and Tommy Lister. It was filmed at the Old State Prison in Rawlins, Wyoming, with many residents on the cast and crew.

Plot

In 1956, inmate Charlie Forsythe of Creedmore Prison was executed via electric chair for a murder he did not commit.

When Creedmore Prison is reopened after thirty years, Charlie Forsythe returns from the afterlife to exact revenge on Ethan Sharpe (Lane Smith) – the officer who stood by as Forsythe was executed.

Inmate Burke (Viggo Mortensen) and all other inmates soon realize that they will all be slaughtered unless Forsythe is allowed to repay his long-standing debt.

Cast
Prison Staff
 Chelsea Field as Katherine Walker
 Lane Smith as Warden Ethan Sharpe
 Arlen Dean Snyder as Captain Carl Horton
 Hal Landon Jr. as Wallace
 Matt Kane as Johnson

Prisoners
 Viggo Mortensen as Burke
 Lincoln Kilpatrick as Cresus
 Tom Everett as Rabbitt
 Ivan Kane as Joe 'Lasagna' Lazano
 André DeShields as Sandor
 Tommy Lister as Tiny
 Stephen Little as 'Rhino' Reynolds
 Mickey Yablans as Brian Young
 Larry "Flash" Jenkins as Hershey
 Kane Hodder as Charlie Forsythe
 Joseph Garcia as inmate getting hair cut

Production
The film was shot on location at the former Wyoming State Penitentiary in Rawlins, Wyoming. The facility had been vacant since its closure in 1981 after the construction of a new State Penitentiary, and was made freely available for film production after producer Irwin Yablans approached the State during a search for abandoned prison facilities as the setting for a prison horror movie.

Because the facility was slated for demolition, little regard was given for its preservation, and the production crew was offered free license to make permanent, oftentimes destructive modifications as necessary. This included drilling a large passage through the prison's reinforced concrete perimeter wall, which was mocked up as a vehicle gate for the film.

A majority of the extras portraying prisoners were real-life inmates of the Wyoming State Penitentiary, including former stuntman Stephen E. Little, who was serving a sentence of manslaughter at the time. His SAG membership dues were paid and current, and he was cast in a speaking role as "Rhino."

The execution chamber shown in the film is the Penitentiary's original gas chamber, which replaced hanging after 1936 as the legal method of execution for condemned criminals in the State. The chamber was never used for electrocutions in reality.

Release
The film was given a limited theatrical release in the United States by the Eden Distributing Company in March 1988.  It grossed $354,704 at the box office.

The film was released in 1988 on VHS by New World Pictures. It had originally been released on DVD overseas, but not in the United States, save for bootlegs.  However, on February 19, 2013, Shout! Factory released the first official Blu-ray Disc and DVD and the first through their new subdivision Scream Factory.

References

External links

 
 

1987 horror films
1987 films
Films set in 1956
American supernatural horror films
Empire International Pictures films
1980s English-language films
Films directed by Renny Harlin
Films produced by Irwin Yablans
Films set in prison
Films scored by Richard Band
Films shot in Wyoming
American ghost films
1980s prison films
1980s American films
Films about miscarriage of justice